Andwell is a village in the Basingstoke and Deane district of Hampshire, England. Its former range was divided by the M3 motorway; it is also bounded to the north by the A30 road. Winchester College has owned land in the village since the 1390s.

Governance
The village of Andwell is part of the civil parish of Mapledurwell and Up Nately (where the 2011 census population was included) and is part of the Basing ward of Basingstoke and Deane borough council. The borough council is a Non-metropolitan district of Hampshire County Council.

Religious sites
The village is home to the ruins of Andwell Priory, a 12th-century Benedictine priory.

Notable people
 Nick Halstead, racing driver and entrepreneur resides in Andwell.

References

External links

Villages in Hampshire